Pudhayal is a 1997 Indian Tamil-language film directed by Selva. The film stars Mammooty, Arvind Swamy and Sakshi Shivanand. The film's score and soundtrack are composed by Vidyasagar.

Cast
 Mammooty as Captain Viswanath, Indian Army officer
 Arvind Swamy as Kodiesvaran
 Sakshi Shivanand as Shobana
 Aamani as Sundari
 Roopa Sri as Anjali
 Goundamani
 Senthil
 Manivannan as Tiruchitrambalam
 Uday Prakash as Madhu
 Alphonsa
 Madhusudhan Rao

Soundtrack
Soundtrack was composed by Vidyasagar. Lyrics were written by Vairamuthu.
 "Ochamma Ochamma" — S. P. Balasubrahmanyam, Uma Ramanan, Unni Menon
 "Poothirukkum Vaname" — Hariharan, Uma Ramanan
 "Enakkum Unakkum" — Gopal Rao, Swarnalatha
 "Dheem Thakka" — Mano, S. Janaki
 "Baba Baba" — Gopal Rao, Vidyasagar

Reception
Indolink called Aravind Swamy as "the only saving grace in the entire movie!" and felt "things lose steam by the second half of the movie and its all downhill from then on" and called Vidyasagar's music as below average as none of the songs were memorable.

References

External links
 

1997 films
Films shot in Ooty
1990s heist films
1990s Tamil-language films
Films scored by Vidyasagar
Indian adventure films
Indian heist films
Films directed by Selva (director)